Magda Blondiau Arnold (born Magda Barta-Blondau; December 22, 1903 – October 5, 2002) was a psychologist. The first contemporary theorist to develop appraisal theory of emotions, which moved away from "feeling" theories (e.g. James-Lange theory) and "behaviorist" theories (e.g. Cannon-Bard theory) toward the cognitive approach. She also created a new method of scoring the Thematic Apperception Test called Story Sequence Analysis.           

She was a 1957 Guggenheim Fellow.

Biography 
Arnold was born in Mährisch Trübau (until 1918 the town was part of the Austrian monarchy; now Moravská Třebová in the Czech Republic) to Rudolph Barta and Rosa Marie Blondiau. She married Robert Arnold and moved to Prague. She sat-in on psychology classes at Charles University where she was employed as a secretary. In 1928, the Arnold's left Czechoslovakia and immigrated to Canada. Arnold had three children: Joan, Margaret, and Katherine. Robert and Magda separated in 1939.

Arnold studied psychology at the University of Toronto where she graduated with a bachelor's degree in 1939. She continued her graduate studies at the University of Toronto, studying the relationship between emotion and muscle tension; she earned her master's degree in 1940, followed by her doctorate in 1942.

In 1942, Arnold was employed at the University of Toronto following her doctorate studies. She was invited to be the Director of Research and Training at the Psychological Services for Canadian Veteran Affairs in 1946. The next year, Arnold accepted a teaching position at Wellesley College. In 1948, she filled in as an associate professor and department chair at Bryn Mawr College. During this time she reunited with her daughter. Two years later, she became the department chair at Barat College to help improve the academic environment. Then, in 1952, Arnold accepted a position at Loyola University (Chicago) to focus on research. She was promoted to director of the Behavior Laboratory. During a twenty-year period, Arnold traveled internationally to teach at universities in eastern Europe while remaining connected with Loyola. In 1972, she faced a minor setback in her research while teaching at Spring Hill College due to a lack of support from the academic community. She quickly moved on to the University of South Alabama Medical School to return to serious studies of the brain. Finally, in 1975, Arnold decided to retire from teaching. She used her time to finish writing her book, Memory and the Brain.

Arnold died in Tucson, Arizona, on October 5, 2002.

Contributions

Thematic Apperception Test 
Post-schooling led Arnold to accept the position of Director of Research and Training for the Canadian Veteran Affairs Department. It was there she developed a system to analyze the Thematic Apperception Test. The system was different than previous measures because it could be used for both “normal and neurotic” patients. Arnold analyzed the test using five subheadings: parent-child situations, heterosexual situations, same-sex situations, singles, and miscellaneous. Each subheading has corresponding scenarios (stories) to compare the patient's responses. The comparisons are used to determine a dominant conflict, and necessary level of treatment.

Theory of Emotion 
Arnold defines emotion as felt tendencies, which is contingent on two processes. (1) A person must perceive an emotion by receiving the external stimuli, remembering the emotion, then imagining the emotion. (2) Next, the emotion is appraised by acknowledging that the external stimuli affected oneself. Arnold characterized emotions as “action-tendencies.” Emotions and actions are linked through motivation, and motivation is reflected upon during appraisal.

Arnold theorized preceding emotions influence subsequent emotions. The three factors contributing to this idea are: affective memory, emotional attitude, and constancy of appraisal. Affective memory is the process of reliving previous experiences and applying the experience to the new situation. Emotional attitude is the imbalance of emotions, which influences appraisal. Constancy of appraisal is the lasting impression on whether the stimuli is good or bad. Arnold explains emotion functions as organized and disorganized. Emotions organize a person's relationship with the world, however emotions can interrupt goal-directed behavior.

Memory and the Brain 
Arnold worked tirelessly to explain the relationship between brain function and memory. She conducted animal research and focused heavily on published work (due to lab restrictions). Arnold faced difficulties with international cooperation followed by publishing delays. Arnold's view on memory was influenced by appraisal; she emphasized memory is a dynamic process. Her work is considered ahead of her time, which influenced later researchers when brain-mapping technology was available.

Other Contributions 
She organized the Toronto Psychology Club to open the lines of discussion among professional colleagues. The club became the Ontario Psychological Association in 1947. She developed workshops to train psychologists in personality testing, which was uncommon due to the popularity of intelligence testing. The workshops focused on improving the quality of life of military veterans following World War II. In 1948, Arnold represented female researchers at the Mooseheart Symposium on Feelings and Emotion.

Works
Arnold, M. B., & Gasson, J. A. (1954).  The human person: An approach to an integral theory of personality. New York: The Ronald Press.
Arnold, M. B. (1960). Emotion and personality. New York: Columbia University Press.
Arnold, M. B. (1962). Story sequence analysis: A new method of measuring motivation and predicting achievement. New York: Columbia University Press.
Arnold, M. B. (1984). Memory and the brain. Hillsdale, NJ: Erlbaum.

References

Sources

Cornelius, R. R. (2006). Magda Arnold's Thomistic theory of emotion, the self-ideal, and the moral dimension of appraisal. Cognition & Emotion, 20, 976-1000.
 Fields, R. M. (2004, Spring). "A life of Science and Spirituality: Magda B. Arnold (1903-2002)" The Feminist Psychologist, pp. 11–12.
Held, L. "Magda Arnold." In A. Rutherford (Ed.), Psychology's Feminist Voices.
Rodkey, E. N. (2015). "Magda Arnold and the human person: A mid-century case study on the relationship between psychology and religion." Doctoral Dissertation, York University, Toronto.
Rodkey, E. N. (2017). “Very much in love”: The letters of Magda Arnold and Father John Gasson. Journal of the History of the Behavioral Sciences, 53, 286-304.
Rodkey, K. L., & Rodkey, E. N. (2020). Family, friends, and faith-communities: Intellectual community and the benefits of unofficial networks for marginalized scientists. History of Psychology, 23(4), 289–311
Shields, S. A. (1999). A conversation with Magda Arnold. The Emotion Researcher, 13(3), 3.
Shields, S. A. (2006). Magda B. Arnold: Pioneer in research on emotion. In D. Dewsbury, L. Benjamin, & M. Wertheimer (Eds.), Portraits of pioneers in psychology (Vol. IV). Washington, DC: American Psychological Association.
Shields, S. A. (2006). Magda B. Arnold's life and work in context. Cognition & Emotion, 20, 902-919.
Shields, S. A. & Fields, R. (2003). Magda B. Arnold (1903-2002). American Psychologist, 58, 403-404.
Shields, S. A. & Kappas, A. (2006). Magda B. Arnold's contributions to emotions research. Cognition & Emotion, 20, 898-901.
Stevens, G. & Gardner, S. (1982). Unacknowledged genius: Magda Blondiau Arnold (1903-). In G. Stevens and S. Gardner, The women of psychology, Vol. II: Expansion and refinement (pp. 126–129). Cambridge, MA: Schenkman Publishing Company.

External links
Transcript of 1976 oral history interview from the Canadian Psychological Association
Finding Aid for the Magda B. Arnold papers at  	the Drs. Nicholas and Dorothy Cummings Center for the History of Psychology at University of Akron.

American women psychologists
20th-century American psychologists
Emotion psychologists
Czechoslovak emigrants to the United States
Czechoslovak emigrants to Canada
Harvard Summer School instructors
Loyola University Chicago faculty
University of Toronto alumni
1903 births
2002 deaths
People from Moravská Třebová
20th-century American women
20th-century American people
American women academics